Russell v R is a landmark Privy Council decision regarding the interpretation of the Constitution Act, 1867, and was one of the first cases explaining the nature of the peace, order and good government power in Canadian federalism. It expanded upon the jurisprudence that was previously discussed in Citizen's Insurance Co. v. Parsons.

Background

In 1878, the Parliament of Canada passed the Canada Temperance Act which allowed for a province or city to hold a plebiscite on banning the sale of alcohol. Fredericton held such a plebiscite which carried successfully.

In 1880, the Supreme Court of Canada decision in The Queen v Fredericton (Mayor) had held that the law was intra vires under the trade and commerce clause. That decision was not appealed to the Privy Council.

In a separate case two years later, Charles Russell, a local pub owner, was convicted under the CTA of selling alcohol. Russell argued that Parliament cannot delegate its powers to any other part of government. The law could best be characterized as either falling into the provinces power to legislate on matters related to taverns and saloons (section 92(9)), property and civil rights (section 92(13)), or matters of a local or private nature (section 92(16)).

Sir Montague Edward Smith rejected Russell's submissions, saying:

Smith upheld the law as a valid exercise of federal power under the doctrine of  "peace, order and good government" which means that any law that cannot be found to be allocated to the provincial head of power under section 92 must necessarily fall into the residual power granted to the federal government. The law was found to be in relation to public order and safety, and thus was a matter of general concern to all of Canada. As to the manner of its operation, Smith noted:

As the issue was decided to fall under the general nature of the "peace, order and good government" power, it was considered unnecessary to determine whether it could have come under a more specific head of federal power. In its closing paragraph, the Board emphasized that its abstention from that discussion was not intended to intimate any dissent from the opinion that the Supreme Court of Canada had previously given on the matter.

Impact

Although the Canada Temperance Act was upheld, the effect of Russell was to restrict the manner in which the more specific heads of federal power were to be interpreted. In the subsequent case of Hodge v. The Queen, followed by others from the Privy Council, the influence of the Supreme Court of Canada diminished and that of the provinces was significantly expanded.

Russell continued to govern the interpretation of the peace, order and good government power until it was effectively overturned by Ontario (Attorney General) v. Canada Temperance Federation in 1946.

References

See also
 List of Judicial Committee of the Privy Council cases

1882 in Canadian case law
Canadian constitutional case law
Judicial Committee of the Privy Council cases on appeal from Canada
Alcohol law in Canada